Arthur John McGovern (February 27, 1882 – November 14, 1915) was a reserve catcher in Major League Baseball who played for the Boston Americans during the  season. Listed at 5' 10", 160 lb., McGovern batted and threw right-handed. He was born in Saint John, New Brunswick, Canada.

In a 15-game career, McGovern was a .114 hitter (5-for-44) with one run, one double and one RBI. He did not hit any home runs. In 15 catching appearances, he committed four errors in 82 chances for a .951 fielding percentage.

McGovern died in Danvers, Massachusetts at age 33.

See also
1905 Boston Americans season
List of Major League Baseball players from Canada

External links

1882 births
1915 deaths
Boston Americans players
Brockton Tigers players
Brockton Shoemakers players
Canadian expatriate baseball players in the United States
Major League Baseball catchers
Major League Baseball players from Canada
Baseball people from New Brunswick
Sportspeople from Saint John, New Brunswick
Lowell Tigers players
Manchester Textiles players
Toronto Maple Leafs (International League) players
Lynn Leonardites players
Fall River Adopted Sons players
Lawrence Barristers players
Lewiston Cupids players